"You Want a Battle? (Here's a War)" is a song by Welsh heavy metal band Bullet for My Valentine. It was released on 29 June 2015, as the second single from the album Venom.

Music video
The music video for "You Want a Battle? (Here's a War)" shows clips of the band performing the song and of the story about a woman and her daughter suffering from domestic violence at the hands of her husband, resulting in them spiking his drink with sleeping pills and setting the house on fire.

Personnel
 Matthew Tuck – lead vocals, rhythm guitar
 Michael "Padge" Paget – lead guitar, backing vocals
 Michael "Moose" Thomas – drums, percussion, backing vocals
 Jamie Mathias - bass guitar, backing vocals
 Carl Bown, Dan Brown, Austin Dickinson, Ryan Richards, Stefan Whiting, Jack Vallier, Henry Boeree, Rebekah Power, Emma Gorman, Lauren Metccalf, Alice Williams, Andrew Humphries, Ginnie Breakwell – additional vocals

Charts

References

2015 singles
Bullet for My Valentine songs
2015 songs
Songs about bullying
Songs written by Matthew Tuck
Songs written by Michael Paget